The 2011–12 season was the 132nd season of competitive football in England.

The season began on 5 August 2011 for the Football League, on 12 August for the Football Conference and 13 August for the Premier League. The Championship ended on 28 April 2012, whilst League One, and League Two ended on 5 May 2012. The Premier League ended on 13 May 2012.

Promotion and relegation (pre-season)
Teams relegated from the Premier League
Birmingham City
Blackpool
West Ham United

Teams promoted to the Premier League
Queens Park Rangers
Norwich City
Swansea City

Teams relegated from the Championship
Preston North End
Sheffield United
Scunthorpe United

Teams promoted to Championship
 Brighton & Hove Albion
 Southampton
 Peterborough United

Teams relegated from League One
 Dagenham & Redbridge
 Bristol Rovers
 Plymouth Argyle
 Swindon Town

Teams promoted to League One
 Chesterfield
 Bury
 Wycombe Wanderers
 Stevenage

Teams relegated from League Two
 Lincoln City
 Stockport County

Teams promoted to League Two
 Crawley Town
 AFC Wimbledon

Honours

Trophy and League Champions

Promotion winners

Playoff winners

Diary of the season

June 2011
17th: Former Birmingham City manager Alex McLeish is appointed manager of Aston Villa.

July 2011
4th: Manchester City sign full-back Gaël Clichy from Arsenal for £7 million.

6th: Rushden & Diamonds, who were members of the Football League from to 2001 to 2006, are expelled from the Conference National due to financial problems.

11th: Arsenal make their second summer signing, Gervinho from French champions Lille for £11 million.

13th: Wolverhampton Wanderers sign defender Roger Johnson from Birmingham City for an undisclosed fee, believed to have surpassed the £7 million the Black Country club paid for Steven Fletcher last summer.

30th: Brighton & Hove Albion finally move into their Amex Stadium at Falmer, first planned in 1999, and open their new home with a 3–2 friendly defeat by Tottenham Hotspur.

August 2011
5th: Football League action kicks off at the KC Stadium, where Hull City lose 1–0 at home to Blackpool in the Championship.

6th: The bulk of the opening Football League fixtures are played. Michael Chopra scores twice on his Ipswich Town debut in the Championship as the Suffolk side win 3–0 at Bristol City. Brighton's first competitive match at their new stadium sees them beat Doncaster Rovers 2–1 with two late goals from Will Buckley overturning a Doncaster lead. League Cup holders Birmingham City lose 2–1 at Derby County. Steve McClaren's first game in charge of Nottingham Forest sees them draw 0–0 at home to Barnsley. Newly promoted Southampton beat Leeds United 3–1 at St Mary's Stadium. In League One, Charlton Athletic triumph 3–0 at home to AFC Bournemouth. Sheffield United get off to a winning start in their quest for a return to the Championship by beating Oldham Athletic 2–0 at Boundary Park. In League Two, Paolo Di Canio gets off to a winning start as Swindon Town manager as he guides the Wiltshire club to a 3–0 home win over Crewe Alexandra. Crawley Town's first Football League game sees them draw 2–2 with Port Vale at Vale Park. AFC Wimbledon, formed nine years ago in response to the relocation of the old Wimbledon club (rebranded as Milton Keynes Dons in June 2004) to Milton Keynes, start their Football League career with a 3–2 home defeat by Bristol Rovers.

7th: Manchester United win the FA Community Shield, beating neighbours City 3–2 at Wembley after going 2–0 down.

8th: Arsenal sign 17-year-old winger Alex Oxlade-Chamberlain from Southampton for £12 million, which could eventually rise to £15 million.

11th: Tottenham Hotspur's opening Premier League game of the season, against Everton on 13 August, is postponed due to recent rioting in and near the Tottenham area.

12th: Kenny Dalglish makes his fifth signing of the close season for Liverpool with a £6 million move for Newcastle United defender José Enrique.

15th: Cesc Fàbregas leaves Arsenal to return to his former club Barcelona for £35 million.

16th: Emmanuel Eboué leaves Arsenal to join Turkish side Galatasaray for £3 million.

24th: Samir Nasri joins Manchester City from Arsenal for £25 million. Juan Mata joins Chelsea from Valencia for £23.5 million.

29th: Edin Džeko scores four goals as Manchester City briefly go top of the Premier League with a 5–1 thrashing of Tottenham Hotspur at White Hart Lane, though they are soon usurped at the top of the table on goal difference by their rivals Manchester United, who demolish Arsenal 8–2 at Old Trafford. The result is Arsenal's worst for 116 years and United biggest goal haul in a league game since February 1999.

31st: August ends with reigning champions Manchester United top of the table on goal difference, ahead of Manchester City. Liverpool. Chelsea, Wolverhampton Wanderers, Newcastle United and Aston Villa complete the top seven, with West Bromwich Albion, Blackburn Rovers and Tottenham Hotspur (all without a point) in the relegation zone. In the Championship, newly promoted Brighton and Hove Albion and Southampton occupy the automatic promotion places, with Derby County, Middlesbrough, West Ham United and Crystal Palace in the playoff places.

September 2011
1st: The transfer window closes with Mikel Arteta ending six years at Everton to sign for Arsenal in a £10 million deal. Arsène Wenger also brings Chelsea's Yossi Benayoun to the Emirates Stadium, on a loan deal for the rest of the season. These acquisitions come 24 hours after Wenger bolsters his defence with a £6.2 million move for Fenerbahçe and Brazil left-back André Santos. Another big money move on deadline day includes Raul Meireles leaving Liverpool in a £10 million move to Chelsea. Having left Manchester United at the end of last season after four injury-plagued seasons, Owen Hargreaves signs for neighbours Manchester City on a one-year contract, after weeks of speculation that he would join West Bromwich Albion. Blackburn Rovers terminate the contract of striker El Hadji Diouf after two years at Ewood Park, where the attack was strengthened the previous day by the arrival of Everton's out-of-favour striker Yakubu.

8th: Dagenham & Redbridge contest a Football League Trophy Round One match against Leyton Orient at The Matchroom Stadium. With the scores level at 1–1 after 90 minutes, the match goes to penalties and as a result become the longest penalty shoot out with consecutive goalscorers in the history of English football and what is believed to be the world. The final score ended as 14–13 to Dagenham on penalties, with Ben Chorley missing the 28th spot kick for Orient which sent the Daggers through to a second round clash with Southend United.

30th: September ends with Manchester United still leading the Premier League, ahead of rivals Manchester City on goal difference. Chelsea remain in third, while Newcastle United are maintaining their European push in fourth place. The top seven is rounded out by Liverpool, Tottenham Hotspur and Stoke City. Blackburn Rovers, West Bromwich Albion and Bolton Wanderers are still suffering from their early season form and make up the relegation zone. In the Championship, newly promoted Southampton are continuing their bid for successive promotions, leading Middlesbrough and Derby County on goal difference. West Ham United, Brighton & Hove Albion and Cardiff City complete the top six, while Millwall, Bristol City and Doncaster Rovers stand at the foot of the table.

October 2011
23rd: Manchester City extend their lead over Manchester United at the top of the Premier League with a 6–1 win over their local rivals at Old Trafford. It was Manchester United's worst loss at Old Trafford since 1955 and the first time they had conceded six goals at home since 1930. Fellow title contenders Chelsea suffer a 1–0 setback against Queens Park Rangers at Loftus Road.

29th: Robin van Persie scores a hat-trick as Arsenal gain a first away league win of the season, beating Chelsea 5–3 at Stamford Bridge.

31st: October ends with Manchester City five points clear of second-placed Manchester United. Newcastle United continue to defy critics who tipped them to struggle this season and stand in third place, while the top seven is rounded out by Chelsea, Tottenham Hotspur, Liverpool and an ever-improving Arsenal side who appear to have put their poor start to the season behind them. At the other end of the table, Wigan Athletic stand bottom after six successive losses; they are joined in the relegation zone by Blackburn Rovers and Bolton Wanderers. In the Championship, Southampton are continuing their bid to become the second team in two seasons to achieve two successive promotion to the Premier League, standing three points clear of second-placed West Ham United. Crystal Palace, expected by many to struggle this season, are three points behind West Ham in third, while the play-off places are completed by Middlesbrough, Derby County and Hull City. Coventry City, Doncaster Rovers and Bristol City make up the relegation zone.

November 2011
18th: League One side Carlisle United announce plans to relocate from Brunton Park, their home since 1909, to a new 12,000-seat stadium.

27th: Football mourns the death of Wales manager Gary Speed, 42, who was found dead at his home in Chester. Speed, who had managed the Welsh side for nearly a year following a brief spell as manager of Sheffield United, was a player in the English leagues for more than 20 years, during which time he won a league title with Leeds United and was an FA Cup runner-up twice with Newcastle United.

28th: Queens Park Rangers chairman Tony Fernandes announces his intention to relocate the club from Loftus Road to a new, bigger stadium elsewhere in West London.

30th: Sunderland manager Steve Bruce becomes the first Premiership manager to be sacked during the season, leaving the north-east club after two-and-a-half years in charge with the Wearside club only two points clear of the relegation zone. The month ends with Manchester City still five points clear of Manchester United. Tottenham Hotspur have put their poor start firmly behind and stand two points behind United with a game in hand. Newcastle occupy the crucial fourth place, while Chelsea have slipped out of the top four after losing three of their last five matches. Liverpool and Arsenal complete the top seven. The relegation zone remains unchanged, except that Wigan Athletic have moved off the bottom of the table at the expense of Blackburn Rovers. Southampton and West Ham United continue to occupy the automatic promotion places in the Championship, while Cardiff City, Middlesbrough, Leeds United and Leicester City (ahead of seventh-placed Brighton on goal difference) make up the playoff zone. Doncaster Rovers and Coventry City remain joint bottom of the Championship, while Nottingham Forest have dropped back into the relegation zone, behind Portsmouth, Bristol City and Ipswich Town on goal difference.

December 2011
6th: Chelsea join Arsenal in the knockout stages of the Champions League with a 3–0 home win over Valencia in their final group game, to ease the pressure on under-fire manager André Villas-Boas after four wins from the previous 10 games in all competitions led to increased speculation about his future as manager.

7th: Manchester United's 2–1 defeat at Basel in Switzerland knocks them out of the Champions League and puts them into the Europa League. Their neighbours Manchester City suffer a similar fate despite their 2–0 home win over Bayern Munich in their final group game.

31st: The year ends with Manchester United joint top of the Premier League after having overcome City's five-point lead, although City have a game in hand. Tottenham Hotspur remain in third, six points adrift of United but with a game in hand, while Arsenal have moved into the crucial fourth place for the first time this season, at the expense of Chelsea. Liverpool and Newcastle complete the top seven. Bolton Wanderers end the year bottom of the Premier League; Blackburn Rovers (who were bottom on Christmas) and Wigan Athletic remain in the relegation zone, although the pressure is building up on Wolverhampton Wanderers and QPR. In the Championship, Southampton remain top and still well placed for a second successive promotion. Middlesbrough now occupy second, while West Ham United, Cardiff City, Reading and Hull City complete the top six. The relegation zone remains unchanged from end of November.

January 2012
31st: January ends with Manchester City still top of the Premier League, but with United now level on points with them, five points ahead of third-place Tottenham. Chelsea, Liverpool, Arsenal and Newcastle complete the top seven. Wigan are bottom of the table, four points adrift of safety, while Wolves and Blackburn are just a single point adrift. West Ham are now top of the Championship, with Southampton, Cardiff, Birmingham, Hull and Blackpool completing the top six. Coventry (last), Nottingham Forest and Doncaster Rovers remain in the relegation zone.

February 2012
3rd: Chelsea and England captain John Terry, awaiting trial on a charge of racially abusing QPR's Anton Ferdinand in a league game on 21 December, is stripped of the England captaincy.

6th: England coach Fabio Capello criticises the decision of the Football Association to strip John Terry of the England captaincy.

8th: Tottenham manager Harry Redknapp and the former Portsmouth chairman Milan Mandarić are cleared of tax evasion after a trial at Southwark Crown Court. Hours after the verdicts are delivered, England coach Fabio Capello announces his immediate resignation and almost immediately there are widespread calls across football for Redknapp to be installed as Capello's successor.

12th: The Black Country derby sees West Bromwich Albion crush Wolverhampton Wanderers 5–1 at the Molineux.

13th: Less than 24 hours after the Black Country derby humiliation, Wolverhampton Wanderers sack manager Mick McCarthy, their manager for five-and-a-half years.

24th: After Alan Curbishley and Walter Smith both rejected the chance to manage Wolverhampton Wanderers, coach Terry Connor is put in charge of the first team until the end of the season.

26th: Kenny Dalglish wins the first trophy of his second spell as Liverpool manager, as they defeat Cardiff City on penalties after a 2–2 draw in the League Cup final – the first time they have won the trophy under the management of Dalglish, who guided them to three league titles and two FA Cups in his first spell as manager.

29th: February ends with Manchester City two points clear of Manchester United in second and ten points clear of Tottenham Hotspur, whose title charge now appears to be over following a 5–2 defeat at rival Arsenal, who end the month in the crucial fourth place. Chelsea, Newcastle and Liverpool remain in the top seven. Although they remain bottom, Wigan are now only one point adrift of safety, joined in the bottom three by Bolton and Blackburn, with Wolves and QPR both within a point of the relegation zone. Southampton are back on top of the Championship, but West Ham are a point behind with a game in hand. Reading, Blackpool, Birmingham and Cardiff make up the play-off zone. Nottingham Forest have now climbed clear of the relegation zone at the expense of a Portsmouth side deduced ten points after entering administration; the South Coast club are sandwiched by Coventry and bottom side Doncaster.

March 2012
4th: Chelsea sack manager André Villas-Boas after nine months in charge, the day after they lost 1–0 in the league at West Bromwich Albion. It is the second time in three weeks that the Black Country side have inflicted a defeat upon a team whose manager has then been sacked. In another twist, Chelsea appoint their assistant manager Roberto Di Matteo, who was sacked as Albion manager last season, in charge until the end of the season.

11th: Manchester United moved to first position in the Premier League for the first time since early October 2011 with ten games remaining after United defeated West Bromwich Albion 2–0 and previous leaders Manchester City loss 0–1 to Swansea.

17th: The FA Cup quarter-final tie between Tottenham Hotspur and Bolton Wanderers at White Hart Lane is postponed after 41 minutes when the visiting team's midfielder Fabrice Muamba is taken seriously ill on the pitch after collapsing.

29th: Aston Villa captain Stiliyan Petrov is diagnosed with acute leukaemia after complaining of a fever following the club's game against Arsenal.

31st: March ends with Manchester United now holding a two-point advantage over City, with a game in hand. The rest of the top seven remains unchanged, except that Everton have now moved ahead of their Merseyside rivals Liverpool, who are in eighth place with a game in hand. Wolves have only managed to pick up one point following the sacking of Mick McCarthy and look doomed for relegation as they stand six points adrift of safety with seven games left to play. Blackburn Rovers, with a game in hand, are ahead of QPR and Wigan only by virtue of goals scored; Bolton are a point ahead of Blackburn, having played the same number of games as their Lancashire rivals. In the Championship, Southampton look certain for promotion as they are six points clear of third-placed West Ham with six games left, although their challenge for the Football League title is coming under threat from Reading, who stand two points behind. Birmingham (with a game in hand), Blackpool and Brighton make up the play-off places, with Middlesbrough only outside on goal difference. At the opposite end of the table, Coventry have climbed out of the drop zone at the expense of Bristol City, although Doncaster and Portsmouth look doomed for the drop.

April 2012
14th: Charlton Athletic become the first League side to gain promotion after a 1–0 win at Carlisle United meant that Charlton were promoted and would be playing Championship football in 2012/13 after a three-year exile. On the same day Fleetwood Town were confirmed as champions of the Football Conference meaning that as from next season they'll be playing League Football for the first time in their history.

17th: Reading are promoted back to the Premier League after a four-year exile by beating Nottingham Forest 1–0 at home.

21st: Already-relegated Doncaster Rovers drag Coventry City down to League One with them by winning 2–0 in the Championship clash at the Ricoh Arena, meaning that the midlanders will be playing third tier football next season for the first time in nearly 50 years. Portsmouth's relegation is also confirmed by a 2–1 home defeat by Derby County, a mere two years after being in the Premier League and four years after winning the FA Cup. Rochdale become the first League One side of the season to suffer relegation, after losing 2–1 at Chesterfield, whose victory keeps their own survival hopes alive. Swindon Town seal promotion from League Two despite a 3–1 defeat at Gillingham, Shrewsbury's chances of sealing promotion are put on hold by a 1–1 draw at Accrington.

22nd: Wolves are relegated from the Premier League after a three-year stay with a 2–0 home defeat by Manchester City, whose title hopes are kept alive by Manchester United being held to a 4–4 draw at Old Trafford by Everton.

28th: Southampton are promoted to the Premier League after a seven-year exile, achieving promotion for the second year running. Shrewsbury Town secure automatic promotion to League One. Macclesfield Town drop back into the Conference after 15 years in the Football League.

30th: April ends with Manchester City top of the Premier League after a 1–0 home win over rivals Manchester United, who are level on point with City but wield an inferior goal difference – both have two games left to play. The race for the last two Champions League places is reaching its climax, with five points separating Arsenal, Tottenham, Newcastle and Chelsea, although Arsenal have played one game more. However, should Chelsea beat Bayern Munich in the Champions League final the West London side will automatically qualify for the Champions League regardless of their final place in the table. Everton's belated challenge for European qualification is over; the sole remaining aim of the season is to finish above archrivals Liverpool, who are two points behind in eighth. Wolves have already been mathematically relegated, while Blackburn and Bolton (the latter with a game in hand) remain in the bottom three, but QPR, Wigan and Aston Villa are not yet certain of safety. In the Championship, Reading and Southampton have achieved promotion to the Premier League. West Ham, Birmingham, Blackpool and Cardiff will compete in the play-offs, while Portsmouth, Coventry and Doncaster are relegated.

May 2012
1st: Roy Hodgson of West Bromwich Albion is confirmed as the next England Manager. Manchester City go top of the Premier League on goal difference with two games remaining with a 1–0 home win over United.

5th: Chelsea win the FA Cup with a 2–1 victory over Liverpool. On the Final Day of the season for League One Sheffield Wednesday pipped Sheffield United to the second automatic promotion slot beating already relegated Wycombe Wanderers 2–0, whilst Stevenage cemented their place in the Play-offs with a 3–0 victory over Bury (Huddersfield Town and Milton Keynes Dons make up the rest of Play-off positions). In League Two Crawley Town won back to back promotions to League One with a 2–1 victory at Accrington Stanley. Southend United, Torquay United, Cheltenham Town and Crewe Alexandra make up the Play-offs. At the other end of the table Barnet survived to fight another season in League Two after beating Burton Albion, this result condemned Hereford United to Conference Football next season.

6th: Manchester City remain top of the Premier League with a 2–0 win at Newcastle United, but their neighbours remain level on points with them by beating Swansea 2–0 at Old Trafford.

7th: Blackburn are relegated from the Premier League after a 1–0 home defeat by Wigan Athletic, ending an 11-year stint in the top flight – the result confirms Wigan's Premier League status for an eighth successive season. Bolton Wanderers occupy the final remaining relegation place and need to win their final game of the season to stand any chance of survival. The only other team in real danger of relegation are QPR, as Aston Villa's much better goal difference means that they will almost certainly stay up.

13th: Manchester City scored twice in stoppage time to be crowned champions for the first time since 1968 as they beat Queens Park Rangers to win the Premier League on goal difference from Manchester United. In scenes of near bedlam, City looked to be suffering a dramatic collapse as QPR – safe after Stoke City drew with Bolton – held on to an unlikely advantage with United leading at Sunderland. Edin Džeko equalised in the second of five minutes of stoppage time before Sergio Agüero scored the goal that won the title.

19th: West Ham United are promoted to the Premier League after beating Blackpool 2–1 at the 2012 Championship Play-Off final at Wembley Stadium. Chelsea won the UEFA Champions League after beating Bayern Munich 4–3 at penalties following a 1–1 draw.

New clubs
 Windsor F.C., a new club formed and owned by fans of the defunct Windsor & Eton F.C., were accepted into the Combined Counties Football League Premier Division (level 9). Their first match in the competition was a 1–1 draw with South Park.
 Guernsey F.C. were accepted into the Combined Counties Football League Division One (level 10). Their first match in the competition was a 5–0 victory over Knaphill.

Clubs removed
 Andover, resigned from Southern League Division One South and West (level 8), 25 July 2011.
 Croydon Athletic, resigned from Isthmian League Division One South (level 8), 18 January 2012.

Retirements

1 September 2011: Steve Lovell, 30, former AFC Bournemouth and Portsmouth striker.
24 October 2011: Luke Nightingale, 30, former Portsmouth and Southend United striker.
13 December 2011: Simon Whaley, 26, former Bury, Preston North End, Norwich City, Chesterfield, Doncaster Rovers and Burton Albion midfielder.
15 December 2011: Paul Boertien, 32, former Carlisle United, Derby County, Walsall and Burton Albion defender.
1 March 2012: Bruno Berner, 34, former Switzerland, Blackburn Rovers and Leicester City defender.
17 March 2012: Scott Severin, 33, former Scotland and Watford midfielder.
3 April 2012: Luke Potter, 22, former Barnsley defender.
28 April 2012: Graham Alexander, 40, former Scotland, Scunthorpe United, Luton Town, Preston North End and Burnley defender.
2 May 2012: Sol Campbell, 37, former England, Tottenham Hotspur, Arsenal, Portsmouth, Notts County and Newcastle United defender.
5 May 2012: Romain Larrieu, 35, former Plymouth Argyle goalkeeper.
9 May 2012: Neil Mellor, 29, former Liverpool and Preston North End forward.
14 May 2012: Ruud van Nistelrooy, 35, former Netherlands and Manchester United striker who scored 95 FA Premier League goals.
19 May 2012: Radhi Jaïdi, 36, former Tunisia, Bolton Wanderers, Birmingham City and Southampton defender.
28 May 2012: Carl Fletcher, 32, former Wales, AFC Bournemouth, West Ham United, Crystal Palace and Plymouth Argyle midfielder.
12 June 2012: Sylvain Wiltord, 38, former France and Arsenal forward.
Summer 2012: Mark Kennedy, 35, former Republic of Ireland, Millwall, Liverpool, Manchester City, Wolverhampton Wanderers, Crystal Palace, Cardiff City and Ipswich Town midfielder/defender.
Summer 2012: Kevin Poole, 48, oldest registered player in the Football League having played as a goalkeeper for 32 years with the likes of Aston Villa, Middlesbrough, Leicester City, Birmingham City, Bolton Wanderers, Derby County and Burton Albion.
Summer 2012: André Ooijer, 37, former Netherlands and Blackburn Rovers defender.
Summer 2012: Rhys Day, 29, former Mansfield Town and Oxford United defender.

Deaths

27 June 2011: Mike Doyle, 64, former Manchester City, Stoke City, Bolton Wanderers and England defender.
5 August 2011: Stan Willemse, 86, former Brighton and Hove Albion, Chelsea, and Leyton Orient defender.
16 August 2011: Frank Munro, 63, former Wolves, Aberdeen and Dundee United defender.
28 August 2011: Bernie Gallacher, 44, former Aston Villa, Doncaster Rovers and Brighton & Hove Albion defender.
29 August 2011: Mark Ovendale, 37, former AFC Bournemouth, and Luton Town goalkeeper
1 September 2011: George Knight, 90, former Burnley forward.
9 September 2011: Laurie Hughes, 87, former Liverpool defender.
11 September 2011: Ralph Gubbins, 79, former Bolton Wanderers, Hull City and Tranmere Rovers forward.
8 November 2011: Jimmy Adamson, 82, former Burnley player and manager who also had short spells in charge of Sunderland and Leeds United.
14 November 2011: Alf Fields, 92, former Arsenal defender.
24 November 2011: Johnny Williams, 76, former Plymouth Argyle and Bristol Rovers wing half.
27 November 2011: Gary Speed, 42, Wales manager who played in midfield for Leeds United, Everton, Newcastle United, Bolton Wanderers and Sheffield United.
7 December 2011: Peter Croker, 89, former Charlton Athletic and Watford full back.
9 December 2011: Len Phillips, 89, former Portsmouth and England forward
25 December 2011: George Robb, 85, former Tottenham Hotspur outside left and British Olympian.
1 January 2012: Gary Ablett, 46, former Liverpool, Everton and Birmingham City defender.
8 January 2012: Graham Rathbone, 69, former Grimsby Town and Cambridge United centre half.
10 January 2012: Cliff Portwood, 74, former Preston North End, Port Vale, Grimsby Town and Portsmouth forward.
16 January 2012: Sigursteinn Gíslason, 43, former Stoke City and Iceland midfielder.
21 January 2012: Ernie Gregory, 90, former West Ham United goalkeeper.
12 February 2012: Malcolm Devitt, 75, former Bradford City inside forward.
13 February 2012: Eamonn Deacy, 53, former Aston Villa, Derby County and Republic of Ireland full back.
14 February 2012: Tom McAnearney, 79, former Sheffield Wednesday, Peterborough United and Aldershot wing half, who also had spells in management with Aldershot and Crewe Alexandra.
February 2012: Peter King, 47, former Crewe Alexandra midfielder.
2 March 2012: Gerry Bridgwood, 67, former Shrewsbury Town and Stoke City midfielder.
9 March 2012: Brian Bromley, 65, former Bolton Wanderers, Portsmouth, Brighton & Hove Albion, Reading and Darlington inside left.
14 March 2012: Ray Barlow, 85, former West Bromwich Albion and Birmingham City left half.
30 March 2012: Barry Kitchener, 64, former central defender who holds the record number of appearances for his only club Millwall.
5 April 2012: Jimmy Lawlor, 78, former Doncaster Rovers and Bradford City centre half.
6 April 2012: Larry Canning, 86, former Aston Villa wing half.
14 April 2012: Eddie May, 68, former Southend United, Wrexham and Swansea City defender, who also managed Newport County, Cardiff City, Torquay United and Brentford.
18 April 2012: Arthur Bottom, 82, former York City, Sheffield United, Newcastle United and Chesterfield striker.
20 April 2012: Alfie Biggs, 76, former Bristol Rovers, Preston North End, Walsall and Swansea Town forward.
8 May 2012: Barry Lowes, 73, former Bury, Coventry City, Blackpool and Swindon Town midfielder.
5 June 2012: Steve Buttle, 59, former AFC Bournemouth midfielder, who also had a lengthy spell in the USA.
6 June 2012: Chris Thompson, 52, former Bolton Wanderers, Blackburn Rovers, Wigan Athletic, Blackpool, Cardiff City and Walsall midfielder/forward.
10 June 2012: Gordon West, 69, former England, Blackpool, Everton and Tranmere Rovers goalkeeper.
23 June 2012: Alan McDonald, 48, former Northern Ireland, Queens Park Rangers and Swindon Town defender.
24 June 2012: Miki Roqué, 23, Real Betis defender who previously played in England for Liverpool and Oldham Athletic.

England national football team

Euro 2012 qualification

Friendlies

League tables

Premier League

In one of the most memorable finishes to a season in recent memory, Manchester City ended a 44-year wait to win their first Premier League title on goal difference, with Sergio Agüero scoring in the last minute of stoppage time during their dramatic 3–2 win over Queens Park Rangers on the final day. Despite being pushed all the way, they won their final six games, while cross-city neighbours Manchester United squandered an eight-point lead in what was largely a trophyless season for Sir Alex Ferguson's men for the first time in six years. Arsenal recovered from a poor start to the season to take third place, while striker Robin van Persie won the Players' Player of the Year Award by scoring 30 goals.

Newcastle finished fifth to qualify for the Europa League, recording their first top-six finish in eight years under Alan Pardew, who won the Manager of the Year award. Chelsea suffered their worst season in ten years, finishing sixth with 64 points; André Villas-Boas, the personal choice for owner Roman Abramovich, was sacked after just nine months with automatic qualification for the Champions League at risk. Under caretaker manager Roberto Di Matteo, however, they excelled in the cup competitions, winning the FA Cup for the fourth time in six seasons. It was the Champions League, though, in which they stunned everyone, storming their way through each round to reach the final against Bayern Munich. Pushing the German powerhouse to penalties, they kept the advantage and ultimately won 4–3, giving them their first European Cup victory and ensuring they qualified for the elite competition once again; their victory meant that fourth-placed Tottenham had to enter the Europa League and caused Harry Redknapp to lose his job after three-and-a-half years in charge.

Liverpool were similar to Chelsea for parts of the league, but ultimately worse as they recorded their lowest league finish for 18 years, finishing in eighth place and only edging ninth-placed Fulham on a higher goal difference; their season was marred by striker Luis Suárez being convicted of racially abusing Manchester United defender Patrice Evra in October. They put this controversy behind them by winning the League Cup, ending five consecutive seasons without winning a trophy. Kenny Dalglish, fabled for his earlier Liverpool managerial reign in the late 1980s, was sacked after just 16 months following a poor finish to the season that saw them pick up just 13 points from 14 games.

For only the second time in Premier League history, all three promoted teams survived, though all finished in the bottom half. Swansea City were the pundit's choice to be relegated, but they defied their critics with their own unique style of football and claimed shock victories over the likes of Manchester City, Arsenal and Liverpool to finish a respectable 11th; by the season's end, Brendan Rodgers was starting to attract the attention of other Premier League teams. Norwich City finished just below them in 12th, impressing on their return to the top flight and also had manager Paul Lambert attracting the attention of other Premier League clubs. Queens Park Rangers were left needing to rely on other results on the last day to help them survive, though a run of 19 points from their last nine home fixtures played a major part in their survival.

The sacking of Mick McCarthy after nearly six years and the appointment of first team coach Terry Connor effectively ended Wolverhampton Wanderers' three-year spell in the top-flight. With just four points and no wins taken from Connor's final 13 games in charge, they finished bottom of the table. Having been clear of the relegation zone at the start of April, Blackburn Rovers were also undone by poor late-season form; losing eight of their last nine games as growing anger from the supporters toward owners Venky's and manager Steve Kean continued. Bolton Wanderers, who coincidentally had been promoted alongside Blackburn in 2001, went down on the last day of the season after a horrible start to the year that saw them bottom for most of the campaign.

Leading goalscorer: Robin van Persie (Arsenal) – 30

Championship

A year after suffering heartbreak in the play-off final, an excellent run of 50 points from their remaining 21 games saw Reading crowned divisional champions, earning promotion to the top flight for only the second time in their history. Having been in the top two for the majority of the season, Southampton finished in the runners-up spot to claim their second successive promotion, returning to the Premier League after a seven-year absence as their revival under Nigel Adkins continued, one year after Norwich won a second successive promotion. West Ham United, who lost out to Southampton on the last day of the season, won promotion via the play-offs, with manager Sam Allardyce passing his former clubs Blackburn and Bolton on the way up.

Doncaster Rovers' luck finally ran out after four years of operating on the division's lowest budget, and they were relegated in bottom place. 11 years after dropping out of the Premier League, Coventry City finally hit rock bottom as they suffered from an ongoing financial crisis and the loss of several key players pre-season, their never-ending downward spiral culminating in relegation to the third tier for the first time since 1964. Portsmouth fell back into financial difficulties and went into administration for the second time in three seasons, with the resulting ten-point deduction dealing a fatal blow to their survival hopes and sending them down to League One (had it not been for Portsmouth's points deduction, Barnsley would have been the third relegated side).

Leading goalscorer Rickie Lambert (Southampton) – 27

League One

Chris Powell's first full season in charge of Charlton earned the Addicks promotion at the third time of asking, leading the division for virtually the entire season to win the title with a club record of 101 points. The two Sheffield clubs contested the second automatic promotion spot; United were in the top two for most of the season, but struggled with form after top scorer Ched Evans was imprisoned for rape, allowing Wednesday to claim second place and a return to the Championship after a two-year absence. It was ultimately to be another Yorkshire side, Huddersfield Town, who were victorious over United in the play-offs, meaning they would be playing in the second tier for the first time since 2001.

After equalling their highest league finish last season, the departure of Keith Hill to Barnsley during the summer meant that Rochdale finished bottom, bringing their long-awaited spell in League One to an end after just two years. Exeter City also failed to build on their near-miss of the previous season's play-offs and finished second bottom, returning to League Two after three years. Chesterfield couldn't adjust to life in the third tier and they too were relegated, despite winning the Football League Trophy. Wycombe Wanderers, who finished six points behind the Spireites last season, didn't last long either, and they also suffered immediate relegation back to League Two.

Leading goalscorer: Jordan Rhodes (Huddersfield) – 36

League Two

Swindon Town made an immediate return to League One, as Paolo Di Canio won the League Two title in his first season as a manager. Shrewsbury took the runners-up spot, going the entire season unbeaten at home and earning veteran manager Graham Turner his second promotion with the club 33 years after his first. Crawley Town were the third automatically promoted team, and earned their second successive promotion. Despite the resignation of legendary manager Dario Gradi early in the season, Crewe Alexandra rallied under new manager Steve Davis and won promotion via the play-offs.

Macclesfield Town dropped out of the Football League after fifteen years, ultimately being undone by a horrific second half of the season in which they didn't win a single game after the turn of the year. Hereford United suffered their second relegation from the League on the last day of the season, with Barnet securing last-day survival for the third season in a row.

Joining the League for the following season were newcomers Fleetwood Town, and York City, who returned to the League after an eight-year absence.

Leading goalscorers: Jack Midson (AFC Wimbledon), Izale McLeod (Barnet), Lewis Grabban (Rotherham United), and Adebayo Akinfenwa (Northampton Town) – 18

Managerial changes

Transfers

References